The Copa del Generalísimo 1959 Final was the 57th final of the King's Cup. The final was played at Santiago Bernabéu Stadium in Madrid, on 21 June 1959, being won by CF Barcelona, who beat Granada CF 4-1.

Details

References

1959
Copa
FC Barcelona matches